TARGET 3001! is a CAD computer program for EDA and PCB design, developed by Ing.-Büro Friedrich in Germany. It supports the design of electronic schematics, PCBs, and device front panels. It runs under Windows and is available in English, German and French.

A special branch of the program is the ASIC Designer, which allows design of integrated circuits.

The free version (for non-commercial use) is limited to 250 connection pins or pads on two copper layers. The PCB manufacturer PCB-Pool and Conrad Electronic provide a free unlimited version, that generates only printed output or output for PCB-Pool and Conrad's PCB service. Commercial versions with all features are available.

Features 
TARGET 3001! collects several features under one user interface (MDI). All project information is stored in one file to avoid redundancy and version conflicts. Design begins with the creation of a schematic diagram and usually ends with the layout of a PCB (or chip).

The schematics can be simulated by the integrated PSPICE compatible mixed mode simulator. Components are stored in a SQLite or MySQL database, also externally accessible. Component data include direct links to datasheets and component supplier information as well as simulation information and 3D models. TARGET's open Component Interchange Format CXF is supported by universal component databases like Ultra Librarian and Footprint Expert.

PCBs or ASICs can be designed manually or using an autoplacer and autorouter. A Specctra interface to external autorouters is available. The design can be automatically checked for spacing violations and many other design rules. If the PCB is ready designed it can be directly displayed and rotated in a live 3D view. The 3D data can be exported in STEP format to produce preview 3D dummies of the PCB on 3D printers. Circuit design on 3D bodies (Molded Interconnect Device, MID) is possible.

CNC data for PCB milling can be obtained in several formats. Additionally a device front panel can directly be derived from the PCB, using the coordinates on the PCB, e.g. from LEDs or potentiometers.

History 

A predecessor of TARGET 3001! was "RULE", a DOS-based program for PCB layout (1989). After hobbyists used this, there were calls for a schematic tool and autorouter. In response, TARGET 2.1 (for DOS) was released in 1992. The move to Windows was difficult: early versions of "TARGET V3 for Windows" were prone to crash. The package became stable and more accepted among hobby, educational and professional users.

Developments in versions V7 to V16 included an EMC tool and PSPICE-compatible simulation. The name TARGET was changed to TARGET 2001!, but, as year 2001 approached, "TARGET 3001!" was registered as a trademark and used for versions V9 and higher.

TARGET 3001! is used also by industrial designers. For example, TOYOTA used it for cable harnesses in their Formula 1 racing car.
 
Today, TARGET 3001! is one of the most popular PCB layout systems in Germany and Europe. Readers of electronics magazine Elektor voted it number two. Also testers of the electronics magazine "c't Hardware Hacks" rated it number two.

See also

 Comparison of EDA software
 List of free electronics circuit simulators

References

External links
 

Electronic design automation software
Electronic design automation companies